Garden Valley is a crossroads community in Smith County about 7 miles west of Lindale, Texas. It is 79 miles east of Dallas.

Historically, prior to the formation of nearby town of Van (6 miles west of Garden Valley) in the late 1920s, when oil was discovered there, Garden Valley was a town with a post office, stage coach station, and  hotel. Today, only one stop sign is in the community's center, with no businesses or public buildings. The city had a population of 150 people in 2000.

Garden Valley is headquarters of Christian ministries Mercy Ships, Youth With A Mission Tyler  and JAMA Global.  It was also the home of Last Days Ministries, the ministry of the late Christian singer Keith Green; Green (along with two of his small children, who died in a plane crash) is interred in the Garden Valley Cemetery behind the local Baptist church.

References

Towns in Texas
Geography of Smith County, Texas